Amt is a type of administrative division governing a group of municipalities, today only in Germany, but formerly also common in other countries of Northern Europe. Its size and functions differ by country and the term is roughly equivalent to a US township or county or English shire district.

Current usage

Germany

Prevalence
The Amt (plural: Ämter) is unique to the German Bundesländer (federal states) of Schleswig-Holstein, Mecklenburg-Western Pomerania and Brandenburg.

Other German states had this division in the past. Some states have similar administrative units called Samtgemeinde (Lower Saxony), Verbandsgemeinde (Rhineland-Palatinate) or Verwaltungsgemeinschaft (Baden-Württemberg, Bavaria, Saxony, Saxony-Anhalt, Thuringia).

Definition
An Amt, as well as the other above-mentioned units, is subordinate to a Kreis (district) and is a collection of municipalities. The amt is lower than district-level government but higher than municipal government, and may be described as a supra-municipality or "municipal confederation". Normally, it consists of very small municipalities (Gemeinden, plural of Gemeinde).

Larger municipalities do not belong to an Amt and are called amtsfreie Gemeinden (independent municipalities); some of these municipalities might also not be governed by or linked with a Kreis (district) and are called kreisfreie Gemeinden, and when they do also not belong to any other Land they are also called Stadtstaaten (plural of Stadtstaat), i.e. city-states (Berlin and Hamburg).

These large municipalities (cities, in German Städte, plural of Stadt) may be further divided into local offices named Ortsämter (plural of Ortsamt), each of them possibly grouping several suburbs (or small townships in rural areas) of the municipality named Ortsteile (plural of Ortsteil), named from small villages or hamlets or localities. The Ortsteil (suburb or township) may have been a former parish, but today it is meant only for civil purpose and essentially used for planning within the municipality; the Ortsamt (sometimes just named informally but confusingly as an Amt, or informally translated as an "urban district") is used to offer decentralized services of the municipality within local administrative offices for the residents in neighbouring suburbs. The Ortsteil itself may also be confusingly translated as a "municipality", but it is incorrect because it belongs to a city which is the only effective municipality (Gemeinde).

Former usage

Denmark
The  (plural, ; commonly translated as "province" or, less accurately, "county") was an administrative unit of Denmark (and, historically, of Denmark-Norway). The provinces were established by royal decree in 1662 as replacements for the former  (fiefs). The  were originally composed of independent towns and parishes, and held only small areas of responsibility. During the 20th century, they were granted responsibility for the hospital service for the non-urban population. A 1970 administrative reform reduced the number of provinces to fourteen and eliminated the administrative distinction between (rural) parish and town. From then on, the amter were composed of a number of municipalities. The reform granted the provinces wider areas of responsibility, most notably running the national health service and the gymnasium secondary schools.

The Danish Municipal Reform of 1 January 2007 abolished the amter and replaced them with five administrative regions, now solely charged with running the national health service. In contrast to the amter the regions hold no authority to levy taxes. The reform re-delegated all other areas of responsibility to either the municipalities or the state. At the same time, smaller municipalities were merged into larger units, cutting the number of municipalities from 270 to 98. See Counties of Denmark for more information about the Danish usage of the term.

Germany 
In Germany an Amt was a medieval administrative district covering a manorial estate or the land owned by a castle or village. It was headed by an Amtmann, usually a lesser nobleman or cleric, appointed by a territorial lord to administer and dispense justice within the Amt.

Iceland
While Iceland was a territory of the Danish-Norwegian realm, amts were established in the country on top of the existing counties. From 1684 to 1770, Iceland as whole was a single amt in the Kingdom of Denmark-Norway but was then split into two amts: North and East Amt and South and West Amt. The latter was in 1787 split into a West Amt and South Amt. Iceland was thus divided into three amts until 1872, when the South and West amts were again merged. Amts were abolished in 1904, when Iceland gained home rule from Denmark.

Amts are not used to denote a geographical region in Iceland but the name lives on in the names of two public libraries in Iceland that were established during the amt era. The Amts libraries in Akureyri and Stykkishólmur which were established as the designated archives for the North and East Amt and the West Amt respectively.

Netherlands and Flanders
Ambacht can be seen as the Dutch equivalent to amt. Ambachten existed in Holland, Zeeland and Flanders up to about 1800.

Norway
From 1662 to 1919, the counties of Norway were called amter. They are now referred to as fylker, a term revived from the Middle Ages.

See also 
 Amtmann

References

Collective municipalities in Germany
Types of administrative division